The Task Control Block (TCB) contains the state of a task in, e.g., OS/360 and successors on IBM System/360 architecture and successors.

The TCB in OS/360 and successors
In OS/360, OS/VS1, SVS, MVS/370, MVS/XA, MVS/ESA, OS/390 and z/OS, the TCB contains, among other data, non-dispatchability flags and the general and floating point registers for a task that is not currently assigned to a CPU.

A TCB provides an anchor for a linked list of other, related request blocks (RBs); the top-linked RB for a TCB contains the Program status word (PSW) when the task is not assigned to a CPU.

When the control program's dispatcher selects a TCB to be dispatched, the dispatcher loads registers from the TCB and loads the PSW from the top RB of the TCB, thereby dispatching the unit of work.

Request Blocks

OS/360 has the following types of request blockss
 Interruption Request Block 
 An IRB is used to handle an asynchronous exit.
 Program Request Block
 A PRB represents a module invoked with an ATTACH macro, a LINK macro or a synchronous exit. 
 System Interruption Request Block
 An SIRB is used to run I/O error recovery code.
 Supervisor Request Blocks 
 An SVRB represents the execution of a Type 2, Type 3 or Type 4 SVC routine

An RB contains several fields, among the na old PSW, old general registers, a PSW and a wait count.

Dispatching
The Dispatcher is a routine in the nucleus that selects the work to be dispatched. It selects the highest priority task that:
Is not running on another CPU
Does not have any non-dispatchability flags set
Has a top RB with a zero wait count.

The system maintains a pair of TCB pointers known as TCB old and TCB new. A TCB new pointer of zero causes the dispatcher to search for an eligible task.

When the dispatcher finds an eligible task, it sets the old and new TCB pointers. loads the registers from the TCB and loads the PSW from the top RB.

If the dispatcher fails to find eligible work, it enters an enabled wait.

History
With the introduction of MVS/370 and successor systems, a whole new environment was introduced: the Service Request Block (SRB), which generally has a higher priority than any Task Control Block, and, indeed, which itself has two distinct priorities: a Global SRB (priority over all local address space SRBs and TCBs) and a Local SRB (priority over only the local address space TCBs); and MVS's dispatcher must manage all of these with absolute consistency across as many as two processors (MVS/370) and as many as sixteen processors (successor systems).

See also
Process control block

Notes

References

Process (computing)